Élisabeth Hildebert de Rozières, known as Babette de Rozières (born 27 May 1947) is a famous French chef, television presenter and politician.

Early life 
She was born in Pointe-à-Pitre in Guadeloupe.

Political career 
She was elected to the regional council of Île-de-France in 2015.

She contested Paris's 17th constituency at the 2017 French legislative election but came in sixth place in the first round.

She is a part of the presidential campaign of Valérie Pécresse for the 2022 French presidential election. She also supported her campaign for President of the Regional Council of Île-de-France.

Electoral record 

 
 
 
 
 
 
 
 
|-
| colspan="8" bgcolor="#E9E9E9"|
|-

External links 

 Babette de Rozières on Twitter

References 

Living people
1947 births
French chefs
French women television presenters
21st-century French politicians
21st-century French women politicians
Black French politicians
Guadeloupean women
The Republicans (France) politicians
Candidates for the 2017 French legislative election